The Old Rose Tree Tavern is a historic inn and tavern located in Rose Tree Park just north of the borough of Media, in Upper Providence Township, Delaware County, Pennsylvania.

History
John Calvert was granted the land that the tavern stands on in 1682 by William Penn.  Daniel Calvert, likely John's grandson, built a frame building along the Providence Great Road (now Pennsylvania Route 252) and was licensed to run a tavern there in 1739.

The current building is a large 2 1/2-story, fieldstone building, built in 1809, on the site of the earlier frame structure.  A stone addition was built in 1836.  The tavern was moved about 100 yards from its original site when PA-252 was widened. During 2011 the building was renovated and now houses the Brandywine Conference & Visitors Bureau.

The tavern was added to the National Register of Historic Places on June 21, 1971.

Gallery

See also

National Register of Historic Places listings in Delaware County, Pennsylvania

References

Hotel buildings on the National Register of Historic Places in Pennsylvania
Federal architecture in Pennsylvania
Commercial buildings completed in 1809
Buildings and structures in Delaware County, Pennsylvania
National Register of Historic Places in Delaware County, Pennsylvania
1739 establishments in Pennsylvania